San Hui is one of the 31 constituencies in the Tuen Mun District.

Created for the 1999 District Council elections, the constituency returns one district councillor to the Tuen Mun District Council, with an election every four years.

San Hui loosely covers areas surrounding Tuen Mun San Hui in Tuen Mun with an estimated population of 20,036.

Councillors represented

Election results

2010s

Notes

References

Tuen Mun
Constituencies of Hong Kong
Constituencies of Tuen Mun District Council
1999 establishments in Hong Kong
Constituencies established in 1999